Date My Family is a South African reality lifestyle romance television series produced by Connect TV for Mzansi Magic. The series aims to help singletons find their love interest by setting them on dates with their potential partner's closest friends and families.

References 
For E.tv and Mzansi Magic networks

Erewind to be replaced by Exposed Extra Emovies Emovies Extra Etoonz No longer on DStv from 1 April 2022 due to money proplems

South African reality television series